Schwann may refer to:

The Schwann cell
Henry Schwann, English cricketer
Theodor Schwann, a German physiologist, histologist and cytologist
Schwann Records, a German record label 
 The Schwann catalog, a listing of in-print sound recordings in the United States, published from the late 1940s through 2001

See also
Schwan (disambiguation)

German-language surnames